Ravula Ravindranath Reddy is a politician from Mahbubnagar district in Andhra Pradesh, India. He was a Member of the Legislative Assembly who represented Alampur constituency four times in Andhra Pradesh. He is the cousin brother of Ravula Chandra Sekar Reddy, a politician from Telugu Desam Party who is a Member of the Legislative Assembly representing Wanaparthy constituency in Andhra Pradesh. Ravindranath Reddy contested the 2009 general elections as an independent candidate from Devarkadra constituency. He owns an educational society and a hospital in Kothakota in Mahbubnagar district. His wife  Dr. R. Parijatham, M.D., DGO is an educationist and gynecologist in Mahbubnagar district.

Early life
Ravula Ravindranath Reddy started his political career in the Bharatiya Janata Party (BJP). He served BJP for several years as MLA and also  played important role in the expansion of BJP in Andhra Pradesh. Later he withdrew his support of BJP as BJP was not giving any clarity on separate Telangana state. Hence he became the co-founder of Telangana Sadhana Samiti (TSS) party which was headed by Tiger Narendra. Later TSS merged in TRS party by the invitation of K. Chandra Shekar Rao.  Ravula Ravindranath Reddy acted as politburo member and steering committee chairman of TSS party.

References 

People from Mahbubnagar district
Members of the Andhra Pradesh Legislative Assembly
Living people
Telugu politicians
Telangana politicians
Bharatiya Janata Party politicians from Telangana
Telangana Sadhana Samithi politicians
Year of birth missing (living people)